Kyn is a rural locality (a selo) in Lysva, Perm Krai, Russia. The population was 805 as of 2010. The population is predominantly engaged in agriculture. There are 14 streets.

Geography 
Kyn is located 86 km southeast of Lysva (the district's administrative centre) by road. Kyn (settlement) is the nearest rural locality.

References 

Rural localities in Perm Krai